Trevor Brown (born 25 March 1940) is a South African cricketer. He played in seven first-class matches from 1957/58 to 1963/64.

References

External links
 

1940 births
Living people
South African cricketers
Eastern Province cricketers
Western Province cricketers
Cricketers from Cape Town